Into the Wind is a documentary directed by Steven Hatton. The documentary features the contributions of RAF Bomber Command aircrew from the Second World War. The film features veterans from across the Commonwealth including veterans from Australia, Canada, Guyana, New Zealand, Poland, Trinidad and United Kingdom. The film focuses on the personal experiences of veterans.

The production team interviewed over 50 veterans during the interview process. Veterans include Les Munro, the last surviving Dams Raid (Operation Chastise) pilot; Cy Grant Guyanese actor, activist and singer; and the aviator Ken Wallis. Wallis, an aviator with over 70 years flying experience  takes to the air for several sequences during the film flying one of his many autogyro designs.

The film, shot in High Definition is due for release in 2012.  The film features many veterans who have never before spoken of their experiences on film.

References

External links
  Into the Wind Official Site
   BBC Article 
 

2012 films
2012 documentary films
British aviation films
British documentary films
World War II aviation films
Documentary films about veterans
Documentary films about military aviation
Documentary films about World War II
2010s British films